The extent of the medieval district of Craven, in the north of England is a matter of debate. The name Craven is either pre-Celtic Britain,  Britonnic or Romano-British in origin. However, its usage continued following the ascendancy of the Anglo-Saxons and the Normans – as was demonstrated by its many appearances in the Domesday Book of 1086. Places described as being In Craven in the Domesday Book fell later within the modern county of North Yorkshire, as well as neighbouring areas of West Yorkshire, Lancashire and Cumbria. Usage of Craven in the Domesday Book is, therefore, circumstantial evidence of an extinct, British or Anglo-Saxon kingdom or subnational entity (such as a shire or earldom).

The modern local government district of Craven – a much smaller area entirely within North Yorkshire – was defined in 1974.

Background

 
Although historic Craven extended a little further southeast in Yorkshire, as it still does with the Church of England's Deanery of South Craven, the northwestern boundary is the one much disputed. Before the Norman Conquest the North of England from coast to coast was administered from York and named The Kingdom of York. By 1086 the Normans had designated only one county in the North of England and that was Yorkshire. One may assume thereby that the Norman Yorkshire of 1086 was much the same as the Kingdom of York of 1065; and the Domesday Book supports this.

The creation of Lancashire, Cumberland and Westmorland took place after 1086: Cumberland may have been shired in 1092, there was a sheriff of Westmorland by 1129, and a sheriff of Lancashire by 1164.

It has also been proposed that the first Yorkshire was smaller, much as it was up till 1974, and that Amounderness, Cartmel, Furness, Kendale, Copeland and Lonsdale were attached to it in the Domesday Book, merely for administrative convenience.

Craven in the Domesday Book

The Domesday Book (1086) was essentially an economic census of England, completed during the reign of William the Conqueror, to find out how much each landholder had in arable land and what that land was worth in terms of the taxes they used to pay under Edward the Confessor.

The areas of ploughland were counted in carucates: the land a farmer could manage throughout the year with a team of eight oxen. That area varied with the local soil but on average it was 120 acres, (50 hectares).  Some carucates are designated Waste, many of these were devastated and depopulated by the Norman army during the Harrying of the North 1069–70, ca.17 years prior to this survey.

The Land of the King in Craven, Domesday Book folio 301v

Mostly in Airedale but also in Lonsdale for that was then considered part of Yorkshire.

LOCATION
Cononley
Bradleys Both
Farnhill
Kildwick
Eastburn
Utley
Keighley
Wilsden
Newsholme
Laycock
Sutton-in-Craven
Melling-with-Wrayton, Hornby-with-Farleton, Wennington
Thornton in Lonsdale, Burrow-with-Burrow

CARUCATES
2
7
2
2 plus 1 church
2 ½
1
6
3
1
2
2
10 ½
6

PREVIOUS OWNER
Thorkil
Arnkeld, Thorkil, Gamel
Gamel
Arnkeld
Gamel Bern
Vilts
Ulfkeld, Thole, Ravensvartr
Gamel Bern
Vilts
Ravensvartr
Ravenkeld
Ulf and Orm
Orm

CURRENT
King William
King William
King William
King William
King William
King William
King William
King William
King William
King William
King William
King William
King William

The Land of The Clamores of Yorkshire in Craven, Domesday Book folio 380 

These lands centred on Bolton Abbey were soon after this date transferred to Robert de Romille. And since the Saxon manse at Bolton Abbey was beyond repair Romille built a castle elsewhere: Skipton Castle.

LOCATION 
Bolton Abbey was the caput manor of a multiple estate

CARUCATES
77, waste

PREVIOUS
Earl Edwin

SOON TO BE
Robert de Romille

The Land of William de Percy in Craven, Domesday Book folio 322

William de Percy was the founder of the powerful English House of Percy.

LOCATION
Rimington, Crooks, Little Middop, Starkeshergh
 Bolton-by-Bowland, Raygill Moss, Holme
Painley, Gisburn, Paythorne, Newsholme, Ellenthorpe
Nappa, Horton
Thornton in Craven, Kelbrook
Swinden, Hellifield, Malham, Coniston Cold
Glusburn and Chelsis

CARUCATES
11, waste
8, waste
12 , waste
6 , waste
8 , waste
13 , waste
3, waste

PREVIOUS
Beornwulf
Beornwulf
Beornwulf
Beornwulf
Beornwulf
Beornwulf
Gamal

CURRENT
William de Percy
William de Percy
William de Percy
William de Percy
William de Percy
William de Percy
William de Percy

The Land of Gilbert Tison in Craven, Domesday Book folio 327 

By 1118 Tison had suffered a demotion and his lands returned to the king then given to the Houses of Romille, Percy, Fitz John and d'Aubigny

LOCATION 
Grassington, Linton, Threshfield
Eastburn, Steeton
Glusburn and Chelsis
Oakworth

CARUCATES
7
5 
3
1

PREVIOUS
Gamal Bern
Gamal Bern
Gamal Bern
Gamal Bern

CURRENT
Gilbert Tison
Gilbert Tison
Gilbert Tison
Gilbert Tison

The Land of Hugh fitzBaldric in Craven, Domesday Book folio 327v 

An "in crave" entry in this folio is difficult to explain. It is followed by Holecher, Bretebi which Robert H Skaife identified with Holker Hall and neighbouring Birkby Hall east of Grange-over-Sands (now in Cumbria), ignoring the Craven title. William Farrer had connected them with Craven as parts of Kettlewell, although no longer traceable. All the rest of Hugh fitzBaldric's land were in East Yorkshire, and he was High Sheriff of Yorkshire 1069–1086.

LOCATION 
Holker? 

CARUCATES
8

PREVIOUS
Orm

CURRENT
Hugh FitzBaldric

The Land of Erneis du Buron in Craven, Domesday Book folio 327v 

In 1066 a nephew of Ralph Tesson, Ernies de Buron, from Beuron near Mantes, Normandy provided William the Conqueror with money, men and the ships for the invasion of England. Ernies fought at the Battle of Hastings and is named in the Falaise Roll and in the Rolls of Battle Abbey. He settled in England 1068. The Doomsday Book lists that he had seventy-two properties in Lincolnshire and Yorkshire. In 1086 he succeeded Hugh fitz Baldric as High Sheriff of Yorkshire. However between 1102 and 1118 his lands were confiscated by King Henry I and given to the House of Romille.

LOCATION 
Marley, Halton (in Bingley), Cottingley, Cullingworth, Hainworth

CARUCATES
7 

PREVIOUS
—

CURRENT
Erneis du Buron

The Land of Osbern D'Arques in Craven, Domesday Book folio 328 

Osbern de Arches  (1059–1115) became High Sheriff of Yorkshire ca1100.

LOCATION 
Silsden
Hebden and Thorpe
Burnsall and Drebley
Cattal

CARUCATES
8
4 
2 
5, waste

PREVIOUS
Five thegns
Dreng
Dreng
—

CURRENT
Osbern D'Arques
Osbern D'Arques
Osbern D'Arques
Osbern D'Arques

The Land of the King's Thegns in Craven, Domesday Book folio 331v 

The term thegn means a retainer of a king or nobleman below the rank of high-reeve.

LOCATION 
Rylstone
Hartlington
Appletreewick
Burnsall, Thorpe
Hartlington
Rylstone
Appletreewick
Holdene
Holdene
Kilnsey
Heuurde
Conistone

CARUCATES
4
1
1 
3 
3
1 
2
2
4
6
1
3

PREVIOUS
Almund
Almund
—
Heardwulf
Northmann
Ramkel
Ketil
Ketil
Gospatric and Ulfkil
Hamal
Gospatric
Arnketil

CURRENT
Dolgfinnr
Dolgfinnr
Dolgfinnr
Heardwulf
Northmann
Ramkel
Orm
Orm
Gospatrick and Ulfkil
Ulf
Gospatric
Ketil

The Land of Roger de Poitou in Yorkshire, Domesday Book folio 332 

In looking for a definition of Craven, Roger de Poitou's entries on folio 332 are ambiguous for that page lacks the heading "In Craven". However some manors listed here as his are described elsewhere in the book as being in Craven. Thornton-in-Craven is quite outspoken in this matter! The omission of a heading could be considered a scribal error. Or, since the previous sub-section was entitled 'In Craven', the scribe may have decided it unnecessary to repeating the heading.

However Poitou's total lands cannot be used to determine the extent of Craven for he also held lands between the Ribble and the Mersey together with Amounderness.

After 1102 Roger rebelled against the King, so Henry I of England confiscated his lands and gave those in upper Wharfedale and upper Airedale to the House of Romille and those in Ribblesdale and around Gisburn to the House of Percy. Sometime after Domesday Poitou had given Bowland to Robert de Lacy, the Baron of Pontefract. The king allowed him to keep Bowland and expanded his lands with the whole of Blackburnshire and part of Amounderness. These lands formed the basis of the Honour of Clitheroe.

References

External links 

The Domesday Book on The National Archives website. Search facilities are free of charge. Downloads are chargeable.
Searchable index of landholders in 1066 and 1087, Prosopography of Anglo-Saxon England (PASE) project.

Domesday
Domesday Book
History of Yorkshire
History of Lancashire